Calendasco is a comune (municipality) in the Province of Piacenza in the Italian region Emilia-Romagna, located about  northwest of Bologna and about  northwest of Piacenza.

Calendasco was founded along the Via Emilia; entering the town over the bridge over the Trebbia River is a plaque commemorating the Battle of Trebbia (213 BC) where the army of Hannibal defeated the Romans.

References

Cities and towns in Emilia-Romagna